Joshua Richard Sullivan (born 4 August 2000) is an English cricketer. He made his List A debut on 6 August 2021, for Yorkshire in the 2021 Royal London One-Day Cup.

References

External links
 

2000 births
Living people
English cricketers
Yorkshire cricketers
Cricketers from Leeds